Daywalker may refer to:

Characters 
 A designation for Marvel Comics characters Blade and Drake (Dracula)
 Blade (New Line Blade franchise character)
 Blade (Marvel Cinematic Universe)
 A designation for vampires or half vampires who are not vulnerable to sunlight:
 Vampire Princess Miyu
 Hazuki, main character in the Japanese anime and manga series Tsukuyomi: Moon Phase
 Vampires in the Japanese light novel, anime and manga series High School DxD

Music
 A stage name, along with Gary D., of German producer and DJ Gerald Malke (born 1964)
 "Daywalker", a song from the album Chasm by Delta-S
 "Daywalker", a song from the album Fire at Zero Gravity by 40 Below Summer
 "Daywalkers", a song from the album Crimson Cord by Propaganda
 "Daywalkers", a track from the soundtrack album  Trinity
 "DayWalker", a song by Machine Gun Kelly featuring Corpse Husband

Nickname 
 Nickname of Peggy Morgan (born 1979), American mixed martial artist

Other Uses 
 "The Daywalker", a comedy series by Trevor Noah
 A name for people with red hair who don't have pale skin and freckles, used in the South Park episode "Ginger Kids"

See also
 Margie Day (1926–2014), American singer also known as Day Walker